Yemen Chronicle: An Anthropology of War and Mediation (Hill & Wang, 2005) is a book written by Harvard professor Steve Caton. It contains a years-long anthropological study of Yemen. The book has two formats: one of field notes done by Caton during his stay in Yemen, the other a review of his field notes after he left Yemen.

References 

Anthropology books
Books about Yemen
Hill & Wang books